Md. Shirajul Islam Mollah is an Independent politician and the incumbent Member of the Bangladesh Parliament from Narsingdi-3.

Career
Mollah was elected to Parliament in 2014 from Narsingdi-3 as an Independent candidate. He is a member of the parliamentary standing committee on railways ministry. He is the managing director of China-Bangla Ceramic Industries Ltd. In 2013, he was elected president of Bangladesh Ceramic Wares Manufacturers Association. On 25 June 2018, he was elected chairman of Prime Bank. He is a sponsor director of the Bank.

References

Living people
10th Jatiya Sangsad members
Year of birth missing (living people)